The Villetta Rose is a late maturing red potato variety. It was developed at the University of Wisconsin-Madison and is under plant variety protection. It originated from a cross between Dark Red Norland and Nordonna varieties. 'Villetta Rose' has a medium to long dormancy, stores well and maintains its red color in storage. It is grown for fresh sale and processing including canning.

Botanical Features 
 The 'Villetta Rose' plant has medium vigorous vines with a semi-erect growth habit. 
 It has dark green leaves and red-purple flowers. 
 Tubers are a medium size and have a uniform spherical shape with shallow eyes.

Agricultural Features 
 'Villetta Rose' is resistant to bruising. 
 It is moderately resistant to PVY, early blight, pink rot and soft rot. 
 It is susceptible to common scab and medium-small tubers may develop skin netting.

References

Potato cultivars